Herman Rudolf Günsberg (1827–1879) was a chemist originating in Pidkamin, near Brody who distinguished himself by his fostering of the economic development of Galicia.

Biography
Initially he launched his academic career by completing a doctoral thesis at the University of Jena. Subsequently, he worked as an assistant professor at the Lviv Polytechnic in Lemberg between 1857 and 1868 and after that he started as the full Professor of Applied Chemistry at the same institution until 1879.

He published both in Polish and German several scientific written works relating to the organising of higher technical education, industrial chemistry and agricultural chemistry. The following are among the first articles worthy of notice: Die Fachschule für chemische Technik an der K. K. Technischen Hochschule zu Lemberg (1866), Szkoly techniczne. Mysli odpowiedniego urzadzenia szkol technicznych (1868), Die chemisch-technischen Fachschulen (1869). His papers were presented in important Central European, English, American and Scandinavian scientific journals particularly in the latter half of the 19th century.

He especially wrote about questions concerning industrial and agricultural chemistry in Austrian Scientific Journals like  “Berichte der Deutschen Chemischen Gesellschaft”, “Wiener Akademische Sitzungsberichte”, “Dingler's Polytechnic Journal". 
He wrote about the ammonia-soda process in the "Berichte der Deutschen Chemischen Gesellschaft" in 1874, of the analysis of the water of the Bronislaw Spring in "Wiener Akademische Sitzungsberichte" in 1861, of vegetable glue made of water-soluble grain “Wiener Akademische Sitzungsberichte” in  1861, about the reactions of rubber with protein “Wiener Akademische Sitzungsberichte” 1862, of the structure of acetone "Wiener Akademische Sitzungsberichte” in 1873 and about hydrocarbons in “Dingler's Polytechnic Journal” in 1873. His articles concerning agriculture were also published in the magazine called "Rolnik" in Lemberg between 1872 and 1873.

References & Bibliography
 
 
 
 
 
 
 
 
 
 
 
 
 
 
 
 
 
 
 
 

1827 births
1879 deaths
19th-century German chemists
University of Jena alumni
People from Lviv Oblast